Jeffrey Karoff is a film maker.

Karoff was nominated at the 86th Academy Awards for Academy Award for Best Documentary (Short Subject) for the 2013 film CaveDigger.

References

External links

Living people
American documentary filmmakers
Year of birth missing (living people)